The 2011 All-Pac-12 Conference football team consists of American football players chosen by various organizations for All-Pac-12 Conference teams for the 2011 Pac-12 Conference football season. The Oregon Ducks won the conference, defeating the UCLA Bruins 49–31 in the Pac-12 Championship game. Oregon then beat the Big Ten champion Wisconsin Badgers in the Rose Bowl 45 to 38. Stanford quarterback Andrew Luck was voted Pac-12 Offensive Player of the Year. Cal linebacker Mychal Kendricks was voted Pat Tillman Pac-12 Defensive Player of the Year.

Offensive selections

Quarterbacks
Andrew Luck, Stanford (Coaches-1)
Matt Barkley, USC (Coaches-2)

Running backs
LaMichael James, Oregon (Coaches-1)
Chris Polk, Washington (Coaches-1)
Stepfan Taylor, Stanford (Coaches-2)
John White, Utah (Coaches-2)

Wide receivers
Robert Woods#, USC (Coaches-1)
Keenan Allen, California (Coaches-1)
Marqise Lee, USC (Coaches-2)
Marquess Wilson, Washington St. (Coaches-2)

Tight ends
Coby Fleener, Stanford (Coaches-1)
David Paulson, Oregon (Coaches-2)

Tackles
Matt Kalil, USC (Coaches-1)
Jonathan Martin (Coaches-1)
Mitchell Schwartz, California (Coaches-1)
David Bakhtiari, Colorado (Coaches-2)

Guards
David DeCastro, Stanford (Coaches-1)
Tony Bergstrom, Utah (Coaches-1)
John Cullen, Utah (Coaches-2)
Garth Gerhart, Arizona St. (Coaches-2)

Centers
Senio Kelemete, Washington (Coaches-2)
Khaled Holmes, USC (Coaches-2)

Defensive selections

Ends
Dion Jordan, Oregon (Coaches-1)
Nick Perry, USC (Coaches-1)
Derrick Shelby, Utah (Coaches-1)
Ben Gardner, Stanford (Coaches-2)
Wes Horton, USC (Coaches-2)
Trevor Guyton, Cal (Coaches-2)
Travis Long, Washington St. (Coaches-2)

Tackles
Star Lotulelei, Utah (Coaches-1)

Linebackers
Josh Kaddu, Oregon (Coaches-1)
Mychal Kendricks, California (Coaches-1)
Chase Thomas, Stanford (Coaches-1)
Dion Bailey, USC (Coaches-2)
Cort Dennison, Washington (Coaches-2)
Alex Hoffman-Ellis, Washington St. (Coaches-2)

Cornerbacks
Nickell Robey, USC (Coaches-1)
Jordan Poyer, Oregon St. (Coaches-2)
John Boyett, Oregon (Coaches-2)
Clint Floyd, Arizona St. (Coaches-2)
Trevin Wade, Arizona (Coaches-2)

Safeties
T. J. McDonald, USC (Coaches-1)
Delano Howell, Stanford (Coaches-1)
Eddie Pleasant, Oregon (Coaches-1)

Special teams

Placekickers
Andre Heidari, USC (Coaches-1)
Jordan Williamson, Stanford (Coaches-2)

Punters
Bryan Anger, California (Coaches-1)
Jackson Rice, Oregon (Coaches-2)

Return specialists 
De'Anthony Thomas, Oregon (Coaches-1)
Jamal Miles, Arizona St. (Coaches-2)

Special teams player
Rhett Ellison, USC (Coaches-1)
Derrick Coleman, UCLA (Coaches-2)

Key
Coaches = selected by Pac-12 coaches

# = unanimous selection by coaches

See also
2011 College Football All-America Team

References

All-Pac-12 Conference Football Team
All-Pac-12 Conference football teams